Elaeomyrmex is an extinct genus of ant in the subfamily Dolichoderinae and containing two species. The fossils were first described from the Florissant Formation, Colorado in 1930.

Only the workers and queens have been properly studied, and it shows the workers were similar in appearance to the queens, except the queens were the largest of the colony.

Species

Elaeomyrmex coloradensis Carpenter, 1930
Elaeomyrmex gracilis Carpenter, 1930

References

†
Oligocene insects
Hymenoptera of North America
Fossil taxa described in 1930
Fossil ant genera
Florissant Formation